Find My Device is an application and service developed by Google to remotely trace, locate and wipe Android devices such as smartphones, tablets and smartwatches, as well as the Pixel Buds.

Features
Find My Device locates and traces missing Android smartphones, tablets and smartwatches, as well as the Pixel Buds. It allows users to remotely locate any Android device linked with their Google account. In order for this to work, the device must be turned on, have a WiFi or mobile data connection, and have location services enabled.

See also
 Find My
 Find My iPhone

References

Android (operating system)
Google
2013 software
mobile software